Efren Saldivar (born September 30, 1969) is an American serial killer who murdered patients while working as a respiratory therapist at Adventist Health Glendale, named at that time Glendale Adventist Medical Center in Glendale, California.

Early life
Born in Brownsville, Texas, he graduated from the College of Medical and Dental Careers in North Hollywood, California in 1988. He obtained work as a respiratory therapist employed by the Glendale Adventist Medical Center, working the night shift when there were fewer staff on duty.

Murders
While working at Adventist Health Glendale in Glendale, California, Saldivar killed his patients by injecting a paralytic drug which led to respiratory and/or cardiac arrest. These drugs could have included morphine and suxamethonium chloride as they were found in his locker with fresh and used syringes. Pancuronium (brand name Pavulon) was used in six murders; this drug is used to stop a patient's respiration when they are about to be put on a medical ventilator. He was careful in the selection of his victims, choosing those who were unconscious and close to death. This led to no easily detectable rise in the rate or distribution of patient deaths when he was on duty. This in turn hampered the investigation, as there were no easily discernible correlations between changes in the distribution or rate of deaths and his shift pattern (a commonly used tool in examining whether malpractice is taking place).

His medical employment was ended on March 13, 1998. Shortly afterward, he confessed to 50 murders (a confession he later retracted). In searching for evidence that would be strong enough to obtain a court conviction, the police exhumed the remains of patients who had died while Saldivar had been on duty and been buried (rather than cremated).  The marker that was being sought was unusually high levels of Pavulon in the cadaver, as this drug remains identifiable for many months (unlike succinylcholine chloride and morphine which are decomposed into innocuous compounds relatively quickly).

Police selected 20 bodies to exhume out of a total of 1,050 patients who had died at Glendale Adventist during Saldivar's shifts. After the exhumations, six cadavers had evidence of a lethal concentration of Pavulon. The medical records of these patients showed that the Pavulon found in their bodies were not prescribed to them by a medical professional.

On March 12, 2002, at age 32, Saldivar pleaded guilty to six counts of murder and received seven consecutive life sentences without the possibility of parole. Saldivar is incarcerated at California State Prison in Corcoran, California.

Number of victims
In his initial confession in 1998, Saldivar told police that he actively killed up to 50 patients and he contributed to the deaths of between 100 and 200 patients. Saldivar later confessed to killing at least 60 patients by 1994, claiming that he "lost count" after that but continued killing for at least three more years. 

The  New Administrative Director of the Respiratory Care department Michael Robert McCarthy, BS, RRT, RCP, 
Former President of the California Society for Respiratory Care led the internal investigation by Adventist Health and the Glendale Police Department. Sgt's Mario & Will took McCarthy's suggestions and found ventilator evidence that pushed Saldivar's attorney to convince him to escape the death penalty. Statistical analysis indicates that the total number of murders committed by Saldivar could be as high as 200, but no convincing physical evidence will ever be available to confirm or refute this possibility due to bodies being cremated after death or simply the effects of bodily harm.

Victims 
 Jose Alfaro
 Salbi Asatryan - Victim's family accepted a $60,000 settlement from the hospital.
 Myrtle Brower
 Balbino Castro
 Jean Coyle - the only victim who survived.
 Luina Schidlowski
 Eleanora Schlegel

See also 
 List of serial killers in the United States
 List of serial killers by number of victims

References

1969 births
American male criminals
American serial killers
American people convicted of murder
American people of Mexican descent
American prisoners sentenced to life imprisonment
Health care professionals convicted of murdering patients
People convicted of murder by Texas
People from Brownsville, Texas
Prisoners sentenced to life imprisonment by Texas
Living people
Male serial killers
Medical serial killers
Poisoners